The canton of Gergy is an administrative division of the Saône-et-Loire department, eastern France. It was created at the French canton reorganisation which came into effect in March 2015. Its seat is in Gergy.

It consists of the following communes:
 
Allerey-sur-Saône
Bey
Les Bordes
Bragny-sur-Saône
Charnay-lès-Chalon
Ciel
Clux-Villeneuve
Damerey
Demigny
Écuelles
Gergy
Lessard-le-National
Longepierre
Mont-lès-Seurre
Navilly
Palleau
Pontoux
Saint-Didier-en-Bresse
Saint-Gervais-en-Vallière
Saint-Loup-Géanges
Saint-Martin-en-Gâtinois
Saint-Maurice-en-Rivière
Sassenay
Saunières
Sermesse
Toutenant
Verdun-sur-le-Doubs
Verjux

References

Cantons of Saône-et-Loire